The Service & Food Workers Union Nga Ringa Tota (SFWU) was a trade union in New Zealand. It was affiliated with the New Zealand Council of Trade Unions and the New Zealand Labour Party.

The SFWU was organised into five industry sectors:
Age Care, Disability, Health & Community Services
Catering, Cleaning and Contract Services
Clerical, Administration & Technical Services
Food & Beverage Manufacturing & Processing
Hospitality, Tourism & Entertainment Services

The Service & Food Workers Union filed a case with the Employment Court against Terranova, a rest home operator, in relation to allegations that it paid its caregivers lower wages that it would otherwise pay if its work force was not predominantly made up of women. The case went all the way to the Court of Appeal of New Zealand, where it was upheld in 2015. The government then took it on itself to negotiate a settlement, which was announced in April 2017 as "the largest pay increase in New Zealand's history".

In October 2015, the Service & Food Workers Union merged with the Engineering, Printing and Manufacturing Union to form E tū.

References

External links
 Official website

New Zealand Council of Trade Unions
Trade unions in New Zealand
Trade unions disestablished in 2015